ISIRTA plays, A-C

Plays, with titles beginning with 'A', 'B' and 'C' on the radio comedy programme "I'm Sorry, I'll Read That Again"

A plays

Ali Baba and the 38 Thieves

Cast

Structure of the episode

Alice in Wonderland

Cast

 Narrators ― Graeme Garden, John Cleese, Tim Brooke-Taylor, and David Hatch
 Alice ― Jo Kendall
 The Little White Looney...er, Rabbit ― David Hatch
 The Red Queen (Lady Constance de Coverlet) ― Tim Brooke-Taylor
 The Cheshire Cat ― John Cleese
 The Caterpillar ― Bill Oddie
 Burrow Surveyor ― Graeme Garden
 Sir Sam Peckinpah, Barrister ― John Cleese
 Bailiff ― Bill Oddie
 Old Father William ― Graeme Garden
 Old Father William's Companion ― John Cleese
 Flamingo Mallet ― Bill Oddie
 Lewis Carroll ― Tim Brooke-Taylor
 Brian Rix ― Graeme Garden 
 Alice in Sunderland Presenter ― Tim Brooke-Taylor
 Sleepy and Happy ― Bill Oddie and John Cleese

Structure of the episode

 Cold Open: The Royal Family ― John Cleese, Jo Kendall, Graeme Garden, Tim Brooke-Taylor, David Hatch, Bill Oddie
 Vox Pop: Insulting Royal Personages ― John Cleese
 Skit: Radio Prune: Wedding of the Year Show
 Skit: It’s a Cock Up ― Graeme Garden, with Tim Brooke-Taylor
 Skit: Russell Harty Plus ― Tim Brooke-Taylor, with Jo Kendall
 Prune Play: Alice In Wonderland ― The Cast

All Hands on Venus

Cast

Structure of the episode
 Skit: Club El Carroway
(new Signature Tune: Tango)
 Skit: Wales Travelogue, Documentary
 Skit: Operating Theatre
 Song: "I'm Gonna Live"
 Play: "All Hands on Venus" (future)

Angus Prune Story

Angus Sotherby's Detective Agency

Cast

Structure of the episode

Audible Road Signs

Cast

Structure of the episode

B plays

Beau Legs

Cast

Structure of the episode

Billy Bunter of Greyfriars School

Cast
 Narrator ― David Hatch
 Billy Bunter ― Bill Oddie
 Mr. Squelch ― Graeme Garden
 Lady Bunter (Lady Constance de Coverlet) ― Tim Brooke-Taylor
 Mary ― Jo Kendall
 Harry Wharton ― Tim Brooke-Taylor
 Bob Cherry ― Graeme Garden
 Hurree Jamset Ram Singh ― Graeme Garden
 Constable ― Bill Oddie
 Warton's Pet Chicken ― Tim Brooke-Taylor
 Catapult ― Graeme Garden
 Creaking Door ― Bill Oddie
 Trembling Building ― Jo Kendall
 Hot Cross Buns ― Graeme Garden
 Puff Pastry ― Tim Brooke-Taylor
 Soft Drink ― Tim Brooke-Taylor
 Cordial Drink ― Graeme Garden
 Striking Clock ― Tim Brooke-Taylor

Structure of the episode

 Cold Open: The Stars at Night, with Patrick Bore ― Graeme Garden
 Skit: The Wireless Doctor ― Tim Brooke-Taylor, Graeme Garden, Jo Kendall, David Hatch, and Bill Oddie
 Skit: 9 O’Clock Honours List ― David Hatch
 Skit: News in Welsh / Minority Programmes ― Graeme Garden, David Hatch, and Jo Kendall
 Skit: Message from the Director-General / Musical Football Results ― David Hatch and Graeme Garden
 Song: "Nigel Carter-Smith’s Society Band" ― Bill Oddie
 Prune Play: Billy Bunter of Greyfriars School ― Bill Oddie, Graeme Garden, Tim Brooke-Taylor, Jo Kendall, and David Hatch

Boadicea – The British Army

Cast

Structure of the episode

Britain for the British (Ireland)

Cast

Structure of the episode

Bunny and Claude

Cast
(cast in order of appearance)

Main characters are listed in bold letters

 Claude — Tim Brooke-Taylor 
 Bunny — Jo Kendall
 W. C. Moss — Bill Oddie
 Old Chap — Graeme Garden
 Police Sergeant — Graeme Garden
 Police Constable Masher — John Cleese
 Buck (Bunny's brother) — David Hatch
 Blanche (Buck's Wife) — Tim Brooke-Taylor

Structure of the episode
 Skit: David Hatch Show (Dave's Diary) – The Cast
 Song: "Magical Mystery Four: I Am the Milkman" – Bill Oddie and the Cast
 Skit: Libel Suit – Tim Brooke-Taylor, John Cleese, and Jo Kendall
 Play: Bunny and Claude – The Cast

Butler Dunnit

Cast

Structure of the episode

C plays

Camelot
aka "Knights of the Round Table"

Cast
Main characters are listed in bold letters

Narrated by David Hatch

 King Arthur — John Cleese
 Queen Guinevere — Tim Brooke-Taylor
 Sir Prancelot — Tim Brooke-Taylor
 Sir Loin of Worcester — Bill Oddie
 Lady Fiona — Jo Kendall
 Black Knight — David Hatch
 Merlin — Bill Oddie
 Servant — Tim Brooke-Taylor
 Jester — Bill Oddie
 Herald — Tim Brooke-Taylor

extra sounds
 Seal — courtesy of Bill Oddie
 Groaning table — courtesy of Tim Brooke-Taylor

Structure of the episode
 Skit: Magician and Wife in the middle of the Night
 Skit: Three babies sketch - (Counting and Alphabet)
 Song: "Waiter, There's a Walrus in My Soup"
 Play: "Camelot" (aka "Knights of the Round Table")

Canterbury Tables

Cast
 Narrator (Geoffrey Chaucer) ― David Hatch
 The Miller ― Graeme Garden
 Mary, the Miller's Daughter ― Jo Kendall
 The Prince ― Bill Oddie
 Granny Prune (Lady Constance de Coverlet) ― Tim Brooke-Taylor
 Dr. Jake Summoned ― John Cleese
 PC Rachel Prejudice ― John Cleese
 Complaining Villager ― Tim Brooke-Taylor
 Bus Conductor Washed in Salt ― John Cleese
 Bus Conductor Washed in Fairy Puff ― John Cleese
 Mice in the Grain Cellar/The Word "Eke" ― John Cleese
 Groaning Wind ― John Cleese

Structure of the episode
 Radio Prune Goes Commercial 
 Skit: The Fairy Puff Man Commercial
 Skit: Home This Afternoon A-Go-Go
 Skit: Commercial Break 
 Skit: The News 
 Song: "Sunday Evening" ― Bill Oddie and the Cast, featuring Tim Brooke-Taylor (as Lady Constance de Coverlet) and John Cleese
 Prune Play: The Canterbury Tales

Champion, the Wonder Mouse

Cast

Structure of the episode

Catermole Sharp and Dr. Gaskit

Cast

Structure of the episode
 Skit: Audible Road Signs
 Skit: Astronaut (Quiz show)
 Skit: Grocery shopping for Warlock (Black Magic)
 Busker song: "Knitting"
 Play:"Catermole Sharp and Dr. Gaskit" (Sherlock Holmes)

Champion the Wonder Mouse

Cast

Structure of the episode
 Skit: Good Evening: (Change of Signature Tune)
 Skit: The Coming of Spring
 Skit: John and Mary sketch (Production of Humpty Dumpty)
 Play: "Champion the Wonder Mouse"
(please note: information about this episode is incomplete, due to a breakdown in radio transmission)

A Christmas Carrot

Cast

Structure of the episode

Circus Life

Cast

Structure of the episode

Cleopatra and Caesar

Cast

Structure of the episode

The Colditz Story

Cast
 Narrator — David Hatch
 Herr General Streich, the Commandant — John Cleese
 Captain Hetheringham Fotheringham Knockingham Rockingham Fortescue Liberty-Bodice Phipps — Tim Brooke-Taylor
 Major Jump — Graeme Garden
 Cockney Soldier — Bill Oddie
 Other Cockney Soldiers — members of the cast.
 Lady Constance de Coverlet — Tim Brooke-Taylor

Structure of the episode
 Intro: "Ministerial Broadcast" - Tim Brooke-Taylor
 Title credits
 Skit: Horrifying "Childhood Memories" - John Cleese
 Skit: Rebel "Radio Terrapin", including "Three programmes sharing a microphone".
 Song : "Bring Back Brian Clough" - Bill Oddie
 Skit : "The Colditz Story", featuring John Cleese as the "Camp" Commandant of Colditz Prison. Colditz is filled with Cockney prisoners who he fears are always trying to escape.  The prisoners are all named Nobby or Chalky.  Cleese takes great delight in the German SS roll call which features such notables as Herr Brush, Herr Net, Herr Restorer, and Herr Cut.  The prisoners escape via a tunnel that emerges in the bath of Lady Constance de Coverlet.  Later they are caught by the Commandant playing cricket in a church.  Bill Oddie explains by reciting a monologue about "The Cricket Bag" that parodies The Deck of Cards as performed by Max Bygraves.  The Commandant listens and then has them all shot.

The Curse of the Flying Wombat (13-part serial)

The Curse of the Workington Shillelagh

Cast

Structure of the episode

External links

ISIRTA plays